"Posthumous Forgiveness" is a song by Australian psychedelic music project Tame Impala. It is the fourth track on the 2020 album The Slow Rush, and was released as a promotional single on 3 December 2019. The song was written by Kevin Parker, who performed all instruments and vocals.

The single peaked at number eight on Billboards Hot Rock Songs chart.

The song was voted into 200nd place on the Australian Triple J Hottest 200 of 2020, which was broadcast on 24 January 2021.

Background
The song was called a "reckoning with Parker's now-deceased father", as well as a cathartic rumination on their complicated relationship and Parker now being a celebrity.

Reception
Pitchfork thought that the riff in the first part of "Posthumous Forgiveness" sounded like something Jimmy Page would have played. The A.V. Club thought that the "mildly trippy effects" in the song "saps poignance" during the first two minutes.

Charts

References

2019 singles
2019 songs
Song recordings produced by Kevin Parker
Songs written by Kevin Parker (musician)
Tame Impala songs
Space rock songs